Due West is a town in Abbeville County, South Carolina, United States. The population was 1,247 at the 2010 census. It is the home of Erskine College and Dixie High School.

History
Some say the name is a mispronunciation of "DeWitt's Corner", while others believe the town was due west on a pioneer trail.

The  Treaty of Dewitt's Corner, a historic peace negotiation in May 1777 with the Cherokee Indians, was signed in Due West.  As a result of the treaty, the Cherokee peoples broke into two factions.  One of them, the Chickamauga Cherokee, continued fighting area settlers for another 17 years.

The Erskine College-Due West Historic District, Lindsay Cemetery, and Young Place are listed on the National Register of Historic Places.

Geography
Due West is located at  (34.332110, -82.387131).

Demographics

As of the census of 2000, there were 1,209 people, 307 households, and 194 families residing in the town. The population density was 738.4 people per square mile (284.6/km2). There were 342 housing units at an average density of 208.9 per square mile (80.5/km2). The racial makeup of the town was 79.24% White, 18.61% African American, 0.08% Native American, 0.99% Asian, 0.25% from other races, and 0.83% from two or more races. Hispanic or Latino of any race were 0.74% of the population.

There were 307 households, out of which 20.2% had children under the age of 18 living with them, 45.9% were married couples living together, 13.7% had a female householder with no husband present, and 36.8% were non-families. 32.2% of all households were made up of individuals, and 14.7% had someone living alone who was 65 years of age or older. The average household size was 2.21 and the average family size was 2.76.

In the town, the population was spread out, with 11.3% under the age of 18, 40.7% from 18 to 24, 14.5% from 25 to 44, 14.7% from 45 to 64, and 18.8% who were 65 years of age or older. The median age was 24 years. For every 100 females, there were 75.2 males. For every 100 females age 18 and over, there were 72.6 males.

The median income for a household in the town was $39,375, and the median income for a family was $53,000. Males had a median income of $35,917 versus $27,000 for females. The per capita income for the town was $22,758. About 9.5% of families and 13.5% of the population were below the poverty line, including 20.0% of those under age 18 and 14.0% of those age 65 or over.

Education
Due West is the home of Erskine College, a private Christian liberal arts college affiliated with the Associate Reformed Presbyterian Church, and Dixie High School, serving grades 8-12. Elementary students in Due West attend Cherokee Trail Elementary in Donalds.

Due West is also home to Erskine Theological Seminary.

Notable people 
 Lawrence Cowan (1858–1933), Arizona territorial legislator, judge, lawyer, and businessman
 Charlayne Hunter-Gault (born 1942), civil rights activist and journalist
 Jim Lauderdale (born 1957), singer and songwriter
 Buck Pressly (1886–1954), professional baseball player and physician

References

External links
 Erskine College
 Erskine Theological Seminary
 Dixie High School
Government information from Municipal Association of SC

Towns in Abbeville County, South Carolina
Towns in South Carolina